The Boston University Terriers men’s ice hockey team is the college ice hockey team that represents Boston University. They played their first game in 1918 and have won five national championships, while making 22 appearances in the Frozen Four.

BU has won 12 major conference tournament championships as well as 31 titles in the historic Beanpot tournament featuring the four major Boston collegiate hockey teams.
BU played in the Eastern College Athletic Conference (ECAC) from 1961 to 1984, winning five tournament championships; and has since competed in the Hockey East Association, winning seven tournament titles. Ice hockey is the most popular sport at Boston University and has a large fan base on campus and among BU alumni nationwide.

Season-by-season results

National Championships
The Terriers have won five national championships, and are the only eastern team to win back-to-back NCAA titles. They won their first title in 1971 and repeated in 1972, with both titles won under head coach Jack Kelley. BU won their other three titles under head coach Jack Parker, in 1978, 1995, and 2009. In 1972, 1995, and 2009, BU won the "triple crown," consisting of the Beanpot, conference tournament and NCAA championships. In 1995 and 2009, the Terriers also won the Hockey East regular season title, giving the team four major trophies in a single season.
The Terriers have appeared in the Frozen Four 22 times and were the runners-up on five occasions. BU has made it to the NCAA Tournament an additional ten times without advancing to the Frozen Four, in 1984, 1986, 1992, 1998, 2000, 2002, 2003, 2005, 2006, 2007,2012 and 2015.

Runners-up in 1950, 1967, 1991, 1994, 1997, 2015

ECAC Conference Championships
BU competed in the ECAC from 1961 to 1984, winning six regular-season titles and five tournament championships.

Hockey East Conference Championships
BU has competed in the Hockey East conference since the 1984–85 season, winning nine ten-season titles and eight tournament championships.

Beanpot results
Boston University is sometimes jokingly referred to as “Beanpot University” because of its success in the annual mid-season hockey tournament called the Beanpot. This highly anticipated single-elimination tournament is contested by Boston University, Northeastern University, Harvard University, and Boston College, with the winner receiving the coveted Beanpot trophy and bragging rights over its Boston rivals. The four-team tournament is played on the first two Mondays of February at the TD Garden. Of the 62 Beanpots played since the 1952–1953 season, Boston University has been victorious on 31 occasions. The Terriers' last win came in 2022 as they defeated Northeastern University 1-0 in the final round.

List of Beanpot championships: 1958, 1966, 1967, 1968, 1970, 1971, 1972, 1973, 1975, 1978, 1979, 1982, 1986, 1987, 1990, 1991, 1992, 1995, 1996, 1997, 1998, 1999, 2000, 2002, 2003, 2005, 2006, 2007, 2009, 2015, 2022

Recent seasons

2009–2010
BU's season started off with a banner-raising ceremony to commemorate the previous season's Beanpot, Hockey East and NCAA championship victories. But it was a disappointing year for the Terriers overall.
BU lost six of its first eight games, and the team finished with an 18–17–3 record that was not good enough to secure a berth in the NCAA tournament.
The season's second half was better than the first, with BU defeating Boston College in a unique game played outdoors at Fenway Park, one of nine wins in a span of 12 games. But the Terriers lost to BC in the title game of the Beanpot tournament and to Maine in the semifinals of the Hockey East tournament, putting an end to BU's defense of its national championship.

2008–2009
The Terriers ended the season as national champions with a 35–6–4 record, setting a team high for games won. They finished the season ranked #1 in both the USCHO.com/CBS College Sports Poll and the USA Today/USA Hockey Magazine Poll, earning the #1 overall seed in the 2009 NCAA championship. BU won a school record 7 championships: the Ice Breaker Invitational, the Denver Cup, the Beanpot, the Hockey East regular season title, the Hockey East tournament, the NCAA Northeast Regional, and finally, the National Championship. The team's success was aided by a strong freshman class (especially goaltender Kieran Millan) and the decisions of senior defenseman Matt Gilroy and sophomore forward Colin Wilson to stick with the team instead of taking offers to go pro.

Following victories against the Ohio State Buckeyes, the UNH Wildcats, and the University of Vermont Catamounts, they defeated the Miami (Ohio) RedHawks 4–3 in OT to capture their first National Championship since 1995 (their fifth ever, and Parker's third as coach). BU trailed 3–1 with one minute left in the game, but scored 2 goals in 42 seconds to tie the score and force sudden death overtime. Sophomore defenseman Colby Cohen scored the game-winning goal on a shot that deflected off a Miami player. The championship game brought the senior class to 100 wins in four seasons.

Longtime head coach Jack Parker, a former Terrier, achieved his 800th win in the January 30th game against Merrimack College. He became only the third college hockey coach to do so, and the first to have all 800 wins be with the same team.

In the Beanpot, the Terriers beat Harvard University 4–3 in the first round and then Northeastern University 5–2 in the championship round. In the Hockey East tournament, they defeated Maine in the quarterfinals, Boston College in the semifinals, and UMass Lowell in the championship game. Down by one goal in the third period against BC, the Terriers scored three goals in 44 seconds – a tournament record. BU defeated Lowell 1–0, with goaltender Kieran Millan earning tournament MVP honors with the shutout.

BU was ranked #1 in the country for most of the season, thanks in part to non-conference victories over powerhouses such as Michigan, North Dakota, Michigan State and Denver. But Northeastern held the top spot in Hockey East play for most of 2008–09, thanks to a better conference record. BU finally overtook Northeastern on the final day of the season, clinching the Hockey East regular season title by one point with a 3–0 victory at home over Providence.

At the end of the season, Gilroy was awarded the Hobey Baker Award, given to the top NCAA men's ice hockey player each year. Colin Wilson had also been among the three finalists. Kieran Millan was named the national Rookie of the Year. During the celebratory parade in Boston a few days after the national championship game, it was announced that Parker had been voted NCAA coach of the year.

2007–2008
BU struggled through the first half of the 2007–2008 season. Inconsistency was a major problem, BU lost to Boston College in the first round of the Beanpot, but played well in the second half of the season to finish in 2nd place in Hockey East. BU's season ended with a loss to Vermont in the Hockey East tournament semifinals. With a 19–17–4 record, BU was not ranked high enough to make the NCAA Tournament.

2006–2007
BU went 20–10–9 in 06-07, finishing in third place in Hockey East and advancing to the NCAA tournament. The team won its 28th total and third consecutive Beanpot tournament title, defeating rival Boston College in overtime. At the end of the season, BU continued their surge for the NCAA tournament by earning home ice in the Hockey East quarterfinals and knocking off the University of Vermont two games to one. BU advanced to the Hockey East semifinals at the TD Banknorth Garden but suffered a devastating 6–2 loss to Boston College, the eventual tournament champions and national runners-up. Boston University was then placed in the NCAA tournament as the 2nd seed in the Midwest Regional (Grand Rapids, MI) and 9th seed overall. BU met 10th overall seed Michigan State University in the first round and lost 5–1. Michigan State eventually went on to win the national championship. Highlights from the season include multiple awards by senior goaltender John Curry, including Hockey East Player of the Year, All-America First Team, national leader in shutouts, and Hobey Baker Award finalist. Senior Sean Sullivan and sophomore Matt Gilroy were named to the All-America Second Team. Junior Pete MacArthur finished first on the team in all scoring categories with 36 total points off 16 goals and 20 assists.

2005–2006
The first full season in Agganis Arena was in many ways a return to glory for the BU hockey program. The Terriers finished 26–10–4, winning the Beanpot, Hockey East regular season title, the Hockey East tournament championship, and a first-round game in the NCAA tournament. BU won hard-fought games against rival Boston College in the Beanpot and Hockey East title game, ultimately winning 18 of their final 21 games heading into the NCAA tournament (with one loss and two ties). The regular season title was BU's first since 2000 and the HE tournament title was its first since 1997.

BU defeated Nebraska-Omaha 9–2 in the first round of the NCAAs, but suffered a 5–0 loss to BC in the regional final. The 2006 squad was led by seniors such as John Laliberte and captains Brad Zancanaro and David Van der Gulik, and received many contributions from underclassmen such as junior goalie John Curry and sophomore forward Pete MacArthur.

The season was also notable for the entrance of six freshmen who would make significant contributions in their inaugural season and ultimately win a national title as seniors. Three of these first-year players – Jason Lawrence, Chris Higgins and Brandon Yip – collaborated to set up perhaps BU's biggest goal of 2006, an overtime strike to win the Hockey East championship over Boston College (Yip tipped in the goal off assists from Lawrence and Higgins).

2004–2005
After a disappointing 2003–2004 season in which BU lost the Beanpot and finished with a losing record, the Terriers were able to turn it around with a 23–14–4 record and an appearance in the 2005 NCAA tournament. BU won the Beanpot over Northeastern with an overtime goal by freshman Chris Bourque, son of Boston Bruins defensemen and Hockey Hall of Famer Ray Bourque.

BU opened the new Harry Agganis Arena midway through the season, with a Jan. 3, 2005 victory over Minnesota, which was ranked number one in the country at the time. Agganis Arena replaced Walter Brown Arena, which had been BU's home ice since 1971.

BU Terriers in the Olympics

BU Terriers on the 1980 U.S. Olympic Hockey team

The' Miracle on Ice' team that defeated the Soviet Union and won the gold medal during the 1980 Olympics in Lake Placid, New York, featured four Boston University players including Olympic team captain Mike Eruzione. Along with Dave Silk, Jack O'Callahan, and goalie Jim Craig, these Terriers played key roles and were the only players from eastern schools on a U.S. squad composed predominantly of Minnesotans.

Eruzione scored the famous winning goal against the Soviets with 10 minutes remaining, and Craig made 36 saves to preserve the 4–3 victory. Silk, who assisted on the United States' second and third goals, was mentioned in sportscast Al Michaels' final call: "Eleven seconds, you've got ten seconds, the countdown going on right now! Morrow, up to Silk. Five seconds left in the game. Do you believe in miracles? Yes!"

O'Callahan, who had injured his left knee in an exhibition match, returned for the famous "Miracle on Ice" game and in his first seconds on the ice, delivered a massive hit on a Soviet player that turned the puck over to the Americans near the Soviet defensive zone. The hit caught the Soviets off guard and set up a goal scored by William "Buzz" Schneider to tie the game at 1–1.

After defeating the Soviet Union squad, the U.S. players went on to defeat Finland to secure the gold medal.

Boston University Olympians
This is a list of Boston University alumni who have played on an Olympic team.

† cut from team before Olympics.

Rivals

Boston College
Boston University's biggest rival is Boston College. Referred to as the Green Line Rivalry or The Battle of Commonwealth Avenue because of the proximity of the schools and the means of transportation to get from one campus to another, the Terriers and Eagles have played each other well over 200 times since their first meeting in 1918. The rivalry is considered one of the best in NCAA hockey, both in terms of intensity and quality. The schools have combined for ten national championships and even played each other in the NCAA championship game in 1978, with BU skating off to a 5–3 victory.

After the 1978 national championship victory over Boston College, BU co-captain Jack O'Callahan was quoted as saying "We shouldn't have to beat BC for the nationals. Hell, we can do that anytime." But every game between the teams is highly anticipated. "You could wake up both teams at three o'clock in the morning and tell 'em we're playing on Spy Pond in Arlington, and they'd be there," BU coach Jack Parker once said.

BU and BC have played at least once a year since 1946, and at least twice a year since 1949. They usually play two Hockey East regular season games each year, and typically face each other once more in February during the Beanpot, with BU holding a substantial edge in tournament and head-to-head victories. The teams have twice played each other for the Hockey East Championship, in 1986 and 2006, with BU winning both titles. In 2005–06, BU and BC played six games—three in the Hockey East regular season, and once each in the Beanpot, Hockey East tournament, and NCAA tournament. At every game, regular season and playoffs, the spirited student sections – BU's nicknamed the Dog Pound and BC's the Superfans – are seated in proximity to each other and hurl insults and chants back and forth. BU and BC ratcheted up their rivalry on Jan. 8, 2010, when they played each other at Fenway Park in front of 38,000 fans, the biggest crowd to ever watch the teams play. BU won the game, 3–2.

Sports Illustrated columnist Steve Rushin went so far as to call BU-BC the biggest rivalry in all of sports. Despite substantial bitterness between the fan bases of the two schools, the hockey teams and coaches generally agree that the magnitude of the rivalry has benefited both hockey programs. "The best thing that ever happened to BU hockey was BC," Parker told Rushin.

The first varsity ice hockey game BU ever played was a 3–1 loss to Boston College on Feb. 6, 1918. As of the 2010–11 season, BU led the all-time rivalry 125–112, with 17 ties.

Cornell
The rivalry between Boston University and Cornell dates to 1925 when Boston University beat Cornell 7–2. The teams played each other in the NCAA championship game in both 1967 and 1972, with Cornell defeating BU 4–1 in '67 and the Terriers taking the '72 title with a 4–0 win. Between the years 1967 and 1977, Boston University and Cornell won the ECAC crown five times each.

The schools renewed the rivalry over Thanksgiving weekend of 2007, with a sold out game dubbed "Red Hot Hockey" at Madison Square Garden in New York, NY. After scoring three goals in the first several minutes of play, BU went on to win 6–3. Red Hot Hockey returned to Madison Square Garden on November 28, 2009, with the two teams skating to a 3–3 tie after one overtime period. The event again sold out the arena. The third meet up on November 26, 2011, resulted in a 2–1 win for BU in overtime.

University of Maine
In the first half of the 1990s, the BU-Maine rivalry was one of the most talked about in college hockey, with the teams battling each other both for eastern and national college hockey supremacy. Boston University defeated Maine in the 1991 Hockey East championship game, in overtime, and Maine returned the favor by soundly beating BU in the HE title game in 1993. In the '93 season, Maine won the national title and lost only one game all year, and it came at the hands of their rivals at BU. Maine had to forfeit most of its wins in the 1994 season because of recruiting violations. BU coach Jack Parker criticized the Maine program, calling the use of ineligible players a "black mark on the league." In 1995, both teams were at the top of their games and faced off in the NCAA championship game in Providence, R.I., which BU won 6–2.

Harvard and Northeastern
BU's rivalries with Harvard and Northeastern stem mainly from regular meetings in the Beanpot, the tournament in which Boston bragging rights are on the line. BU also plays Northeastern three times each year in conference regular season play, and sometimes plays the ECAC-based Harvard in a nonconference game early in the season. BU, BC, Northeastern and Harvard formerly played their home games in the Boston Arena, the site of the first Beanpot in 1952 and the current home of Northeastern. BU stopped playing home games in Boston Arena when it opened the Walter Brown Arena in 1971.

Awards and honors

Hobey Baker Award winners

The Hobey Baker Award is an annual award given to the top National Collegiate Athletic Association men's ice hockey player. It is named for hockey player and World War I hero Hobey Baker.

Forward Chris Drury became BU's first Hobey winner after a senior campaign in which he scored 28 goals and assisted on 29 more. Drury's 113 career goals are the most in BU history. Drury has gone on to a successful NHL career, which included the 1999 rookie of the year award and a 2001 Stanley Cup championship with Colorado. After captaining BU as a senior, Drury has also worn the captain's "C" for both the Buffalo Sabres and New York Rangers.

Defenseman Matt Gilroy won BU's second Hobey Baker trophy after a senior season in which he scored 8 goals and posted 29 assists. Gilroy came to BU as a walk-on and became a three-time All-American. After winning the Hobey and national championship, Gilroy signed a two-year contract with the New York Rangers.

Forward Jack Eichel won the Hobey Baker in 2015, after putting a 71-point year in only 40 games, becoming the third BU player to win the MVP trophy. He edged the two others nominees that year, Zane McIntyre from North Dakota, and Jimmy Vesey from Harvard University. Vesey went on and won it the year after. Following his stellar first year in BU, Eichel went on to be drafted second overall by the Buffalo Sabres, and would sign his entry level contract after, putting an end to his short NCAA career.

Other awards

USA Hockey College Player of the Year
Colin Wilson: 2009

Walter Brown Award (Best American-born Div. 1 player in New England)
Ed Walsh: 1973
Cleon Daskalakis: 1984
David Sacco: 1993
Jacques Joubert: 1994
Mike Grier: 1995
Jay Pandolfo: 1996
Chris Drury: 1997, 1998
John Curry: 2007
Matt Gilroy: 2009

NCAA

Individual awards

Tim Taylor Award
Kieran Millan: 2009
Jack Eichel: 2015
Clayton Keller: 2017

NCAA Scoring Champion
Jack Garrity: 1950
Herb Wakabayashi: 1967
Jack Eichel: 2015

Spencer Penrose Award
Harry Cleverly: 1958
Jack Parker: 1975, 1978, 2009

NCAA Tournament Most Outstanding Player
Ralph Bevins: 1950
Bob Marquis: 1960
Barry Urbanski: 1960
Dan Brady: 1971
Tim Regan: 1972
Jack O'Callahan: 1978
Chris O'Sullivan: 1995
Colby Cohen: 2009

All-Americans
First Team

1949–50: Ralph Bevins, G; Jack Garrity, F
1950–51: Jack Garrity, F
1952–53: Richard Rodenhiser, F
1957–58: Bob Dupuis, D; Don MacLeod, D; Bob Marquis, F
1958–59: Bob Marquis, F
1963–64: Richie Green, D
1964–65: Jack Ferreira, G; Tom Ross, D
1965–66: Tom Ross, D; Fred Bassi, F
1966–67: Brian Gilmour, D
1967–68: Herb Wakabayashi, F
1968–69: Herb Wakabayashi, F
1969–70: Mike Hyndman, D
1970–71: Bob Brown, D; Steve Stirling, F
1971–72: Dan Brady, G; Bob Brown, D; John Danby, F
1972–73: Ed Walsh, G; Steve Dolloff, F
1973–74: Vic Stanfield, D; Bill Burlington, F
1974–75: Vic Stanfield, D; Rick Meagher, F
1975–76: Peter Brown, D; Rick Meagher, F
1976–77: Rick Meagher, F
1978–79: Jim Craig, G; Jack O'Callahan, D
1983–84: Cleon Daskalakis, G
1990–91: Shawn McEachern, F
1991–92: David Sacco, F
1992–93: David Sacco, F
1993–94: Mike Pomichter, F
1994–95: Mike Grier, F
1995–96: Jay Pandolfo, F
1996–97: Jon Coleman, D; Chris Drury, F
1997–98: Tom Poti, D; Chris Drury, F
2002–03: Freddy Meyer, D
2005–06: Dan Spang, D
2006–07: John Curry, G
2007–08: Matt Gilroy, D
2008–09: Matt Gilroy, D; Colin Wilson, F
2009–10: Colby Cohen, D
2014–15: Matt Grzelcyk, D; Jack Eichel, F
2015–16: Matt Grzelcyk, D
2016–17: Charlie McAvoy, D
2019–20: David Farrance, D
2020–21: David Farrance, D

Second Team

1983–84: T. J. Connolly, D
1985–86: Jay Octeau, D; John Cullen, F; Clark Donatelli, F
1991–92: Tom Dion, D
1992–93: Kaj Linna, D
1993–94: J. P. McKersie, G; Rich Brennan, D; Jacques Joubert, F
1994–95: Kaj Linna, D; Chris O'Sullivan, F
1995–96: Jon Coleman, D; Chris Drury, F
1996–97: Chris Kelleher, D
1997–98: Chris Kelleher, D
1998–99: Michel Larocque, G
1999-00: Chris Dyment, D
2000–01: Carl Corazzini, D
2001–02: Chris Dyment, D
2005–06: John Curry, G
2006–07: Matt Gilroy, D; Sean Sullivan, D
2007–08: Bryan Ewing, F; Pete MacArthur, F
2008–09: Kevin Shattenkirk, D
2015–16: Danny O'Regan, F

ECAC Hockey

Individual awards

ECAC Hockey Player of the Year
Bob Brown: 1972
Peter Brown: 1976
Cleon Daskalakis: 1984

ECAC Hockey Rookie of the Year
Richie Green: 1963
Herb Wakabayashi: 1967
Mike Hyndman: 1968
Bob Brown: 1971
Vic Stanfield: 1973
Mark Fidler: 1978
Bill Whelton: 1979
John Cullen: 1984

ECAC Hockey Outstanding Defenseman
Richie Green: 1964
Tom Ross: 1965

ECAC Hockey Most Outstanding Player in Tournament
John Danby: 1972
Ed Walsh: 1974
Rick Meagher: 1975, 1977
Terry Meagher: 1976

All-ECAC Hockey
First Team

1961–62: Glen Eberly, G
1963–64: Richie Green, D
1964–65: Jack Ferreira, G; Tom Ross, D
1965–66: Jack Ferreira, G; Peter McLachlan, D; Bruce Fennie, F; Fred Bassi, F
1966–67: Peter McLachlan, D
1968–69: Herb Wakabayashi, F
1969–70: Mike Hyndman, D
1970–71: Bob Brown, D; John Danby, F; Steve Stirling, F
1971–72: Dan Brady, G; Bob Brown, D
1972–73: Vic Stanfield, D
1973–74: Ed Walsh, G; Vic Stanfield, D; Bill Burlington, F
1974–75: Brian Durocher, G; Vic Stanfield, D; Mike Eruzione, F
1975–76: Peter Brown, D; Rick Meagher, F; Mike Eruzione, F
1976–77: Rick Meagher, F
1977–78: Jack O'Callahan, D
1978–79: Jim Craig, G; Jack O'Callahan, D
1983–84: Cleon Daskalakis, G; T. J. Connolly, D

Second Team

1962–63: Richie Green, D; Mike Denihan, F
1963–64: Jack Ferreira, G; Bruce Fennie, F
1965–66: Tom Ross, D
1966–67: Wayne Ryan, G; Brian Gilmour, D
1967–68: Mike Hyndman, F; Herb Wakabayashi, F
1968–69: Mike Hyndman, F
1970–71: John Jordan, D
1971–72: Ric Jordan, D; John Danby, F
1972–73: Steve Dolloff, F; Dave Wisener, F
1973–74: Peter Brown, D; Rick Meagher, F
1974–75: Peter Brown, D; Rick Meagher, F
1976–77: Mike Eruzione, F
1977–78: Dick Lamby, D; Dave Silk, F
1982–83: Cleon Daskalakis, G

Hockey East

Individual awards

Hockey East Player of the Year
Jay Pandolfo: 1996
Chris Drury: 1997, 1998
John Curry: 2007
Jack Eichel: 2015

Bob Kullen Coach of the Year
Jack Parker: 1986, 1992, 2000, 2005, 2006
David Quinn: 2015

Len Ceglarski Award
Steve Thornton: 1995
Chris Higgins: 2008
Chris Connolly: 2012

Hockey East Best Defensive Defenseman
Chris Dyment: 2002
Sean Sullivan: 2007

Hockey East Best Defensive Forward
Chris Drury: 1998
Mike Pandolfo: 2002
Mark Mullen: 2003
Brad Zancanaro: 2006
Chris Connolly: 2012

Hockey East Scoring Champion
Mike Pomichter: 1994
Chris Drury: 1997, 1998
Bryan Ewing: 2008
Colin Wilson: 2009
Jack Eichel: 2015

Hockey East Three-Stars Award
John Curry: 2007
Bryan Ewing: 2008
Kieran Millan: 2012
Jack Eichel: 2015
Clayton Keller: 2017

Hockey East Goaltending Champion
Derek Heriofsky: 1992, 1994
Tom Noble: 1996
Michel Larocque: 1997, 1998
John Curry: 2007

Hockey East Rookie of the Year
Scott Young: 1986
Scott Cashman: 1980
Rick DiPietro: 2000
Brandon Yip: 2006
Colin Wilson: 2008
Kieran Millan: 2009
Charlie Coyle: 2011
Jack Eichel: 2015
Clayton Keller: 2017
Joel Farabee: 2019

William Flynn Tournament Most Valuable Player

Peter Marshall: 1986
Shawn McEachern: 1991
Michel Larocque: 1997
Sean Fields: 2003
David Van der Gulik: 2006
Kieran Millan: 2009
Jack Eichel: 2015
Jake Oettinger: 2018

All-Hockey East
First Team

1984–85: John Cullen, F
1985–86: Scott Shaunessy, D; David Quinn, D; John Cullen, F
1990–91: Shawn McEachern, F
1991–92: Tom Dion, D; David Sacco, F
1992–93: Kevin O'Sullivan, D; David Sacco, F
1993–94: Rich Brennan, D; Jacques Joubert, F
1994–95 †: Kaj Linna, D; Mike Grier, F; Chris O'Sullivan, F
1995–96 †: Jon Coleman, D; Chris Drury, F; Jay Pandolfo, F
1996–97 †: Tom Noble, G; Jon Coleman, D; Chris Drury, F
1997–98: Tom Poti, D; Chris Drury, F
1998–99: Michel Larocque, G
1999–00: Chris Dyment, D
2000–01: Carl Corazzini, F
2002–03: Freddy Meyer, D
2004–05: Bryan Miller, D
2005–06: John Curry, G; Dan Spang, D
2006–07: John Curry, G; Sean Sullivan, D; Matt Gilroy, D
2007–08: Matt Gilroy, D; Bryan Ewing, F; Pete MacArthur, F
2008–09: Matt Gilroy, D; Colin Wilson, F
2009–10: Matt Gilroy, D
2011–12: Adam Clendening, D
2014–15: Matt Grzelcyk, D; Jack Eichel, F
2015–16: Matt Grzelcyk, D; Danny O'Regan, F
2016–17: Charlie McAvoy, D

Second Team

1984–85: Scott Shaunessy, D
1985–86: Terry Taillefer, G; Clark Donatelli, D
1986–87: John Cullen, F
1987–88: Mike Kelfer, F
1988–89: Mike Kelfer, F
1989–90: Scott Cashman, G; Shawn McEachern, F
1990–91: Tony Amonte, F
1991–92: Kevin O'Sullivan, D
1992–93: Kaj Linna, D
1993–94: Derek Herlofsky, G; Scott Malone, D; Mike Latendresse, F
1997–98: Michel Larocque, G; Chris Kelleher, D
1999–00: Rick DiPietro, G; Pat Aufiero, D
2001–02: Chris Dyment, D
2004–05: John Curry, G
2005–06: Pete MacArthur, F
2006–07: Pete MacArthur, F
2008–09: Kieran Millan, G; Kevin Shattenkirk, D
2010–11: Kieran Millan, G; David Warsofsky, D
2011–12: Garrett Noonan, D; Chris Connolly, F
2012–13: Evan Rodrigues, F
2014–15: Matt O'Connor, D; Danny O'Regan, F; Evan Rodrigues, F
2016–17: Jake Oettinger, G; Clayton Keller, F
2017–18: Dante Fabbro, D; Bobo Carpenter, F
2018–19: Dante Fabbro, D
2021–22: Domenick Fensore, D; Wilmer Skoog, F

Third Team

2017–18: Jordan Greenway, F

All-Rookie Team

1984–85: Clark Donatelli, F
1987–88: Tom Dion, D
1989–90: Scott Cashman, G; Peter Ahola, D; Tony Amonte, F
1990–91: Scott Lachance, D; Keith Tkachuk, F
1991–92: Rich Brennan, D; John Lilley, F; Mike Pendergast, F
1993–94: Shawn Bates, F
1994–95: Chris Kelleher, D
1995–96: Michel Larocque, G
1996–97: Tom Poti, D
1997–98: Carl Corazzini, F
1999–00: Rick DiPietro, G; Freddy Meyer, D; Brian Collins, F
2001–02: Ryan Whitney, D; Brian McConnell, F
2002–03: Jēkabs Rēdlihs, D; David Van der Gulik, F
2003–04: Kevin Schaeffer, D
2004–05: Chris Bourque, F; Pete MacArthur, F
2005–06: Brandon Yip, F
2007–08: Kevin Shattenkirk, D; Colin Wilson, F
2008–09: Kieran Millan, G; Chris Connolly, D
2009–10: Max Nicastro, D
2010–11: Adam Clendening, D; Charlie Coyle, F
2011–12: Alexx Privitera, D
2012–13: Matt Grzelcyk, D; Danny O'Regan, F
2013–14: Robbie Bailargeon, F
2014–15: Jack Eichel, F
2015–16: Charlie McAvoy, D; Jakob Forsbacka Karlsson, F
2016–17: Jake Oettinger, G; Patrick Harper, F; Clayton Keller, F
2017–18: Shane Bowers, F; Brady Tkachuk, F
2018–19: Joel Farabee, F
2021–22: Ty Gallagher, F

† Hockey East made no distinction between first- and second-team all-conference teams from 1994–95 to 1996–97.

Travis Roy

On Oct. 20, 1995, BU raised its fourth national championship banner as it opened a new season, yet just moments later the program suffered its greatest on-ice tragedy. On that night Travis Roy, a freshman recruit who grew up in Maine, was paralyzed from the neck down just eleven seconds into his first college shift. The 20-year-old Roy crashed head-first into the boards after a University of North Dakota player, Mitch Vig, avoided his check. Roy cracked his fourth vertebra and was left a quadriplegic.

Roy missed a year of college, but ultimately returned to BU, earning a degree in communications in 2000. Roy has remained a presence with the BU hockey program, attending games and on several occasions joining his teammates on the ice to celebrate Beanpot championships. Roy, today a motivational speaker, has become an inspirational figure for sufferers of spinal cord injuries. In 1997 he founded the Travis Roy Foundation to raise money for research and individual grants, and in 1998 he published an autobiography titled Eleven Seconds. Roy remains close with Coach Jack Parker.

"It's very special to be a part of the BU hockey family," Roy wrote in a new afterword in the 2005 edition of his autobiography. "Coach Parker looks after his players long after they have played their last game for him."

In October 1999, Roy's #24 was retired, and raised to the rafters of Walter Brown Arena. Roy was the only BU hockey player to have been honored with a retired number until former head coach Jack Parker's number was retired in March 2014, though Roy was the only player to have his number retired under Parker's long tenure.

Roy died on October 29, 2020, at the age of 45.

All-time scoring leaders

Career points leaders

Single-season points record:
Jack Garrity, 84 points in 1949–50

Career goals leaders

Single-season goals record:
Jack Garrity, 51 goals in 1949–50

Career assists leaders

Single-season assists record:
Vic Stanfield, 60 assists in 1974–75

Goaltending leaders

Career save percentage leaders (min. 40 games):

Single-season save percentage record:
Tim Regan, 92.9% in 1970–71

Career goals against average leaders:

Single-season goals against average record:
Tim Regan, 1.77 goals against in 1970–71

Notable coaches

Wayland Vaughan
Wayland Vaughan coached Boston University from 1928 until 1943, compiling an 87–82–8 record. Vaughan was far from the most successful coach in terms of winning percentage, but maintained the Terriers program in the face of both the Great Depression and World War II. Without any conference affiliation, Boston University played erratic schedules, with anywhere from 10 to 15 games per season.

Harry Cleverly
Harry Cleverly, the BU coach from 1945 until 1962, guided the Terriers into the era of the NCAA tournament, which began in 1948, and brought BU to its first national championship game in 1950 and an additional three appearances in the tournament, which consisted of just four teams in those years. Under Cleverly's watch, BU helped create the Beanpot tournament and joined the ECAC hockey league.

Jack Kelley
Jack Kelley was the first coach to bring BU to the summit of college hockey. Kelley coached just ten seasons but appeared in four NCAA tournaments and won back-to-back titles in 1971 and 1972, his final years behind the bench. Kelley also won three ECAC regular season titles, one ECAC tournament title, and six Beanpots. Kelley recruited Jack Parker, who captained the Terriers in 1968 and became an assistant coach under Kelley.

Leon Abbott
Leon Abbott succeeded Kelley, and picked up where Kelley left off with a sterling 22-win season in 1972–73. However, eleven of his wins were forfeited due to an ineligible player. Six games into his second season, Abbott was abruptly fired for withholding information about two Canadian players who had played junior hockey in their home country. The ECAC had ruled them ineligible, only to be cleared to play by a judge. At a conference meeting, Abbott admitted not pressing the players to disclose the compensation they received as juniors. Although the judge hinted that the eligibility rules were unconstitutional, BU's administration was concerned enough about possible sanctions that it fired Abbott and named his assistant, Jack Parker, his successor.

Jack Parker
Jack Parker is the longest-tenured and winningest coach in Boston University history. Parker's accomplishments are almost unparalleled in college sports. In 40 years, he won 876 games, the highest tally for a hockey coach who has spent his whole career at just one school, while winning 21 Beanpot titles, 11 conference tournament titles and three national championships in 1978, 1995, and 2009. Parker helped found Hockey East in 1984, when several teams broke away from the ECAC to form their own conference, and played a crucial role in building Boston University's state-of-the-art arena. The ice sheet at Agganis Arena bears his name – Jack Parker Rink. Parker was voted NCAA hockey coach of the year in 1975, 1978, and 2009, and his 30 NCAA tournament wins are among the most of all time. At the conclusion of the 2012–2013 regular season, on his birthday, Parker announced his retirement.

All-time coaching records
As of the completion of 2021–22 season

* Leon Abbott was fired in December of 1973.& Abbott's record was 26–8–1 before the school was forced to forfeited 11 wins from the 1972–73 season.

Terriers in the NHL
As of July 1, 2022.

† Mike Sullivan won two Stanley Cups as the head coach for the Pittsburgh Penguins

WHA
Additionally, three former Terriers played in the World Hockey Association, a rival league that folded and merged with the NHL in 1979.

Terriers in the U.S. Hockey Hall of Fame

Tony Amonte
Jim Craig
Mike Eruzione
Jack Garrity
Jack Kelley
Jack O'Callahan
Dave Silk
Keith Tkachuk
Scott Young

Craig, Eruzione, O'Callahan and Silk were inducted as members of the 1980 U.S. Olympic hockey team.

NHL first round draft picks
The Terriers have had nineteen players who were chosen in the first round of the NHL Entry Draft as of the 2018–2019 season:

David Quinn 1984, 13th Overall
Scott Young 1986, 11th Overall
Keith Tkachuk 1990, 19th Overall
Scott Lachance 1991, 4th Overall
Jeff Kealty 1994, 22nd Overall
Rick DiPietro 2000, 1st Overall
Ryan Whitney 2002, 5th Overall
Kevin Shattenkirk 2007, 14th Overall
Colin Wilson 2008, 7th Overall
Charlie Coyle 2010, 28th Overall
Jack Eichel 2015, 2nd Overall
Clayton Keller 2016, 7th Overall
Charlie McAvoy 2016, 14th Overall
Dante Fabbro 2016, 17th Overall
Kieffer Bellows 2016, 19th Overall
Brady Tkachuk 2018, 4th Overall
Joel Farabee 2018, 14th Overall
Jay O'Brien 2018, 19th Overall
Trevor Zegras 2019, 9th overall

Agganis Arena
BU plays its home games at Agganis Arena (capacity 6,150) in Boston, Massachusetts. The hockey rink at the arena is named Jack Parker Rink after the team's longtime coach. Agganis Arena first opened its doors on January 3, 2005, for a hockey game versus the University of Minnesota. The student section at BU, also known as “The Dog Pound,” is located in sections 117–119 and 107–109 at Agganis Arena.

Current roster
As of August 26, 2022.

|}

See also
Boston University Terriers women's ice hockey

References

External links

 
Ice hockey teams in Boston